is an art festival which started in 2009. Started by the local government, it is held every three years in Niigata City, Japan. The main theme of the festival is “Where have we come from, and where are we going? - From Niigata’s Water and Land: Examining the Future through the Present and the Past -.” It aims to explore how local culture in Niigata has been influenced by the water and land in the area, and at the same time, it also asks participants to reflect upon the relationship between nature and humanity. Niigata has always been known as "a place of meeting between water and land", as it is situated between two major rivers in Japan, the Shinano and the Agano, and is known as for its wetlands and rice-growing regions. It also illustrates the respect for the wisdom of Niigata residents' predecessors overcoming natural disasters.

History

Water and Land Niigata Art Festival 2015 
Date Saturday, June 18 - Monday, October 12, 2015 (total 87 days)

Location

 Main Fields: Toyanogata, Fukushimagata, Sakata and Uwasekigata
 Base Camp: Former Futaba Junior High School
 Satellite Festival Locations: Tenjuen Garden and IKUTOPIA SHOKU HANA (Food & Flower Complex)

Participating artists

 Eisaku Andou
 Katsumi Asaba
 /BONBORI Lighting Architect & Associates, Inc.
 Atelier Bow-Wow
 Dot architects (Toshikatsu Ienari + Takeshi Shakushiro + Wataru Doi)
 Takashi Fujino / Ikimono Architects
 Anne Graham
 Guan Huai Bin
 Katsuhiko Hibino
 Naoki Ishikawa
 Yukihisa Isobe
 Masahide Kakudate
 Kimio Tsuchiya Art Project Team (Tadayuki Tahara + Kohsuke Kimura)
 Masayuki Kishimoto
 Chie Konno
 Shunsuke Kurakata
 Noriaki Maeda
 Junko Maruyama × Hukazawa Art Laboratory Planting Labo Cabu
 Miki Maruyama＋Akira Hasegawa
 Yuuki Minamikawa
 Noism 0
 Noism 1
 Noism 2
 Shohei Oka ＋ Kenraku Tokumoto
 Yoshihide Ohtomo
 Rica Ohya
 Oscar Oiwa
 Jaume Plensa
 Koichi Sakao
 Tetsuo Sekine
 【SHELTER】project GOZU-NS
 Yee Sookyung
 Yoichi Takada
 Nobuyuki Takahashi
 Team Monolith
 Mariko Tomomasa
 u ru sa☆nai
 Wang Wen-Chih
 World Dirt Association
 Xiao Xiao
 Yuri Miyauchi
 Yukihiro Yoshihara

Water and Land Niigata Art Festival 2018  
Water and Land Niigata Art Festival 2018 (in Japanese also called ”水と土の芸術祭2018”) marked the 4th “Water and Land – Niigata Art Festival”.

 Date: 14/07/2018–08/10/2018 (87 days)
 Venues: Bandaijima Multipurpose Plaza (main venue); Niigata City Center for Creative Arts and International Youth Exchange, and others at various locations within Niigata City (satellite venues)
 General Director: Arata Tani
 Organisers: Water and Land Niigata Art Festival 2018 Execution Committee
 This exhibition worked with artists inside and outside Japan, and the participation of citizens of Niigata.
List of participating artists:

 Shin Morikita
 Navin Rawanchaikul
 Yasuaki Onishi
 Shiro Matsui
 Kosho Ito
 Chiharu Shiota
 Toshikatsu Endo
 Takahiro Iwasaki
 Ryoichi Majima
 Jaume Plensa
 Miho Takamizawa
 Enpei Ito
 Fumito Urabe
 Kiyoko Sakata
 Kenichi Ushikubo
 Satoshi Kakuchi
 Motohiro Tomii
 Enpei Ito
 Miho Takamizawa
 Chika Ito
 Yoo, Geun-Taek
 Kei Arai
 Sergey Vasenkin
 Han Ishu
 Syoin Kajii
 Toshikatsu Endo
 Akiko Ikeuchi
 Tadasu Yamamoto
 Noe Aok
 Chisen Furukawa
 Satoru Hoshino
 Chie Aoki
 Satoru Hoshino
 Kei Arai×Yoo, Geun-Taek
 Satoru Hoshino
 Chisen Furukawa
 Yuki Minamikawa
 Guan Huai Bin
 Tatsumi Orimoto
 Han Ishu
 Terue Yamauchi
 Noe Aoki
 Yukihisa Isobe
 Katsuhiko Hibino
 Yoichi Takada
 Kimio Tsuchiya APT
 Katsumi Asaba

Number of visitors: approximately 717,000 people

References

Further reading
 

Festivals in Japan
Niigata (city)